Eva Todor Nolding (born Eva Fodor; 9 November 1919 – 10 December 2017) was a Brazilian actress and dancer.

Biography 
Eva Fodor was born in Budapest but emigrated with her family to Brazil in 1929. She later changed her surname to Todor. She was married twice – to Luís Iglesias from 1935 until his death in 1963, and to Paulo Nolding from 1964 until his death in 1989. She had no children.

Todor died in Rio de Janeiro on 10 December 2017 of pneumonia while suffering from Alzheimer's and Parkinson's disease, aged 98.

Filmography 
Cinema
1960: Os Dois Ladrões as Madame Gaby
1964: Pão, Amor e... Totobola as Costa's wife
2003: Xuxa Abracadabra as Grandma
2008: Meu Nome Não É Johnny as Dona Marly

Television
1975: Roque Santeiro as Ambrosina Abelha "Dona Pombinha" (unreleased)
1977: Locomotivas as Kiki Blanche
1984: Partido Alto as Cecília
1989: Top Model as Morgana Kundera
1992: De Corpo e Alma as Calu (Maria Carolina Pastore)
1993: Olho no Olho as Veridiana
2000: O Cravo e a Rosa as Josefa Lacerda de Moura
2002: Sítio do Picapau Amarelo as Maria José (Mazé)
2005: América as Miss Jane
2009: Caminho das Índias as Ms. Cidinha
2012: As Brasileiras (Episode: "A Vidente de Diamantina") as Dona Conchita
2012-2013: Salve Jorge as Dalia (final appearance)

References

External links 

1919 births
2017 deaths
Actresses from Budapest
Brazilian Jews
Brazilian television actresses
Brazilian telenovela actresses
Brazilian film actresses
Hungarian emigrants to Brazil
Hungarian Jews
Deaths from Parkinson's disease
Deaths from Alzheimer's disease
Deaths from dementia in Brazil
Neurological disease deaths in Rio de Janeiro (state)